Rugby League Live 4 is a video game developed by Big Ant and published by Tru Blu, part of the Rugby League video game series. The game was released on 28 July 2017 for consoles in Australia and was announced in conjunction with the NRL. It is available on Xbox One, PlayStation 4 and PC Steam, which was released on 13 September 2017.

The game is available in Australia, New Zealand, the UK and the U.S., sporting different cover athletes similar to its predecessor, Rugby League Live 3, released in September 2015.

Commentary 
Andrew Voss, the commentator of many previous Rugby League video game iterations, returned to fulfill his role, accompanied by newcomer British commentator Eddie Hemmings, who replaced Phil Gus Gould, the commentator in previous Rugby League games. As a result of this, new commentary dialogue was recorded as all previous interactions between Andrew and Phil was scrapped.

See also

Rugby League (video game series)

References

External links
Rugby League Live 4 set for 2017 release
Rugby League Live 4 on Steam

2017 video games
Big Ant Studios games
Multiplayer and single-player video games
PlayStation 4 games
Rugby league video games
Sports video games with career mode
Video games developed in Australia
Video games set in Australia
Video games set in England
Video games set in France
Video games set in New Zealand
Video games set in Wales
Windows games
Xbox One games
Tru Blu Entertainment games